The Jordanian annexation of the West Bank formally occurred on 24 April 1950, after the 1948 Arab–Israeli War, during which Transjordan occupied territory that had previously been part of Mandatory Palestine and had been earmarked by the UN General Assembly Resolution 181 of 29 November 1947 for an independent Arab state to be established there alongside a Jewish state mainly to its west. The annexation tripled the population of Transjordan, from 400,000 to 1,300,000.

During the war, Jordan's Arab Legion took control of territory on the western side of the Jordan River, including the cities of Jericho, Bethlehem, Hebron, Nablus and eastern Jerusalem, including the Old City. Following the end of hostilities, the area that remained under Jordanian control became known as the West Bank.

During the December 1948 Jericho Conference, hundreds of Palestinian notables in the West Bank gathered, accepted Jordanian rule and recognized Abdullah as ruler. The West Bank was formally annexed on 24 April 1950, but the annexation was widely considered as illegal and void by most of the international community. A month afterwards, the Arab League, having received assurances from Jordan, resolved to treat the annexed area as being held in trust until the Palestine question was resolved. Recognition of Jordan's declaration of annexation was granted by the United Kingdom, the United States, Iraq, and possibly Pakistan, and no objections were raised when Jordan was admitted to the United Nations in 1955.

When Jordan transferred its full citizenship rights to the residents of the West Bank, the annexation more than doubled the population of Jordan. The naturalized Palestinians enjoyed equal opportunities in all sectors of the state without discrimination, and they were given half of the seats of the Jordanian parliament.

After Jordan lost the West Bank to Israel in the 1967 Six-Day War, the Palestinians there remained Jordanian citizens until Jordan renounced claims to and severed administrative ties with the territory in 1988.

Background

Partition and 1947/8 diplomacy
Prior to hostilities in 1948, Palestine (modern-day West Bank, Gaza Strip and Israel) had been administered by the British Empire pursuant to the Mandate for Palestine, having captured it from the Ottomans in 1917. The British, as custodians of the land, implemented the land tenure laws in Palestine, which it had inherited from the Ottoman (as defined in the Ottoman Land Code of 1858), applying these laws to both Arab and Jewish tenants, legal or otherwise. Toward the expiration of the British Mandate, Arabs aspired for independence and self-determination, as did the Jews of the country.

On 29 November 1947 the UN General Assembly passed Resolution 181 which envisaged the division of Palestine into three parts: an Arab State, a Jewish State and the City of Jerusalem. The proposed Arab State would include the central and part of western Galilee, with the town of Acre, the hill country of Samaria and Judea, an enclave at Jaffa, and the southern coast stretching from north of Isdud (now Ashdod) and encompassing what is now the Gaza Strip, with a section of desert along the Egyptian border. The proposed Jewish State would include the fertile Eastern Galilee, the Coastal Plain, stretching from Haifa to Rehovot and most of the Negev desert. The Jerusalem Corpus Separatum was to include Bethlehem and the surrounding areas. The proposed Jewish State covered 56.47% of Mandatory Palestine (excluding Jerusalem) with a population of 498,000 Jews and 325,000 Arabs while the proposed Arab State covered 43.53% of Mandatory Palestine (excluding Jerusalem), with 807,000 Arab inhabitants and 10,000 Jewish inhabitants and in Jerusalem, an international trusteeship regime where the population was 100,000 Jews and 105,000 Arabs.

In March 1948, the British Cabinet had agreed that the civil and military authorities in Palestine should make no effort to oppose the setting up of a Jewish State or a move into Palestine from Transjordan.
The United States, together with the United Kingdom favoured the annexation by Transjordan. The UK preferred to permit King Abdullah to annex the territory at the earliest date, while the United States preferred to wait until after the conclusion of the Palestine Conciliation Commission brokered negotiations.

Entry of Transjordan forces into Mandate Palestine
Following the End of the British Mandate for Palestine and Israel's declaration of independence on 14 May 1948, the Arab Legion, under the leadership of Sir John Bagot Glubb, known as Glubb Pasha, was ordered to enter Mandatory Palestine and secure the UN designated Arab area.

Armistice
By the end of the war, Jordanian forces had control over the West Bank, including East Jerusalem. On 3 April 1949, Israel and Jordan signed an armistice agreement. The main points included:
 Jordanian forces remained in most positions they held in the West Bank, including East Jerusalem and the Old City.
 Jordan withdrew its forces from its front posts overlooking the Sharon plain. In return, Israel agreed to allow Jordanian forces to take over positions in the West Bank previously held by Iraqi forces.
 A Special Committee was to be formed to make arrangements for safe movement of traffic between Jerusalem and the Mount Scopus campus of the Hebrew University of Jerusalem, along the Latrun-Jerusalem Highway, free access to the Holy Places, and other matters. The committee was never formed, and access to the Holy Places was denied to Israelis.

The remainder of the area designated as part of an Arab state under the UN Partition Plan was partly occupied by Egypt (Gaza Strip), partly occupied and annexed by Israel (West Negev, West Galilee, Jaffa). The intended international enclave of Jerusalem was divided between Israel and Jordan.

Jordanian occupation and annexation

The road to annexation
After the invasion, Jordan began making moves to perpetuate the Jordanian occupation over the Arab part of Palestine. King Abdullah appointed governors on his behalf in the Arab cities of Ramallah, Hebron, Nablus, Bethlehem, Ramla and the Arab controlled part of Jerusalem, that were captured by Legion in the invasion. These governors were mostly Palestinians (including Aref al-Aref, Ibrahim Hashem and Ahmed Hilmi Pasha), and the Jordanians described them as "military" governors, so that it would not anger the other Arab states, which opposed Jordan's plans to incorporate the Arab part of Palestine into the kingdom. The king made other smaller moves towards the annexation of the West Bank: He ordered Palestinian policemen to wear the uniforms of the Jordanian police and its symbols; he instituted the use of Jordanian postage stamps instead of the British ones; Palestinian municipalities were not allowed to collect taxes and issue licenses; and the radio of Ramallah called the locals to disobey the instructions of pro-Husseini officials and obey those of the Jordanian-backed governors.

The December 1948 Jericho Conference, a meeting of prominent Palestinian leaders and King Abdullah I, voted in favor of annexation into what was then Transjordan. Transjordan became the Hashemite Kingdom of Jordan on 26 April 1949. Military occupation concluded on 2 November 1949 via promulgation of the Law Amending Public Administration Law in Palestine whereby the laws of Palestine were declared to remain applicable. In the Jordanian parliament, the West and East Banks received 30 seats each, having roughly equal populations. The first elections were held on 11 April 1950. Although the West Bank had not yet been annexed, its residents were permitted to vote.

Annexation
A 1949 amendment to the British Mandate’s 1928 Nationality Law in 1949 effectively imposed Jordanian citizenship on 420,000 indigenous Palestinians and 280,000 refugees in the West Bank and 70,000 refugees in the East Bank before formal annexation on 24 April 1950. Then in 1954, Jordan’s Nationality Law clarified the conditions under which Arabs with previous "Palestinian nationality" could obtain Jordanian citizenship.

Unlike any other Arab country to which they fled after the 1948 Arab–Israeli War, Palestinian refugees in the West Bank (and on the East Bank) were given Jordanian citizenship on the same basis as existing residents. Elihu Lauterpacht described it as a move that "entirely lacked legal justification." The annexation formed part of Jordan's "Greater Syria Plan" expansionist policy, and in response, Saudi Arabia, Lebanon and Syria joined Egypt in demanding Jordan's expulsion from the Arab League. A motion to expel Jordan from the League was prevented by the dissenting votes of Yemen and Iraq. On 12 June 1950, the Arab League declared the annexation was a temporary, practical measure and that Jordan was holding the territory as a "trustee" pending a future settlement. On 27 July 1953, King Hussein of Jordan announced that East Jerusalem was "the alternative capital of the Hashemite Kingdom" and would form an "integral and inseparable part" of Jordan. In an address to parliament in Jerusalem in 1960, Hussein called the city the "second capital of the Hashemite Kingdom of Jordan".

Only the United Kingdom formally recognized the annexation of the West Bank, de facto in the case of East Jerusalem. In 1950, the British extended formal recognition to the union between the Hashemite Kingdom and that part of Palestine under Jordanian control - with the exception of Jerusalem. The British government stated that it regarded the provisions of the Anglo-Jordan Treaty of Alliance of 1948 as applicable to all the territory included in the union. The United States Department of State also recognized this extension of Jordanian sovereignty. Pakistan is claimed to have recognized Jordan's annexation too, but this is disputed. Despite Arab League opposition, the inhabitants of the West Bank became citizens of Jordan.

Tensions continued between Jordan and Israel through the early 1950s, with Palestinian guerrillas and Israeli commandos crossing the Green Line. Abdullah I of Jordan, who had become Emir of Transjordan in 1921 and King in 1923, was assassinated in July 1951 during a visit to the Jami Al-Aqsa on the Temple Mount in East Jerusalem by a Palestinian gunman following rumours that he was discussing a peace treaty with Israel. The trial found that this assassination had been planned by Colonel Abdullah el-Tell, ex-military governor of Jerusalem, and Musa Abdullah Husseini. He was succeeded by his son Talal and then his grandson Hussein.

Access to holy sites

Clauses in the 3 April 1949 Armistice Agreements specified that Israelis would have access to the religious sites in East Jerusalem. However, Jordan refused to implement this clause arguing that Israel's refusal to permit the return of Palestinians to their homes in West Jerusalem voided that clause in the agreement. Tourists entering East Jerusalem had to present baptismal certificates or other proof they were not Jewish.

The special committee that was to make arrangements for visits to holy places was never formed and Israelis, irrespective of religion, were barred from entering the Old City and other holy sites. Significant parts of the Jewish Quarter, much of it severely damaged in the war, together with synagogue such as the Hurva Synagogue, which had also been used as a military base in the conflict, were destroyed. and it was said that some gravestones from the Jewish Cemetery on the Mount of Olives had been used for construction, paving roads and to build latrines for a nearby Jordanian army barracks.
The Jordanians immediately expelled all the Jewish residents of East Jerusalem. Mark Tessler cites John Oesterreicher as writing that during Jordanian rule, "34 out of the Old City's 35 synagogues were dynamited. Some were turned into stables, others into chicken coops."

Aftermath

Six-Day War and end of Jordanian control

By the end of the Six-Day War, the formerly Jordanian-controlled West Bank with its one million Palestinian population had come under Israeli military occupation. About 300,000 Palestinian refugees were expelled or fled to Jordan. After 1967, all religious groups were granted administration over their own holy sites, while administration of the Temple Mount – sacred to Jews, Christians, and Muslims – remained in the hands of the Jerusalem Islamic Waqf.

Jordanian disengagement

Jordanian disengagement from the West Bank (in Arabic: قرار فك الارتباط), in which Jordan surrendered the claim to sovereignty over the West Bank, took place on 31 July 1988. On 31 July 1988, Jordan renounced its claims to the West Bank (with the exception of guardianship over the Muslim and Christian holy sites in Jerusalem), and recognized the Palestine Liberation Organization as "the sole legitimate representative of the Palestinian people."

Following the Six-Day War in 1967, Israel occupied the West Bank (including East Jerusalem). Although the sides were technically at war, a policy known as "open bridges" meant that Jordan continued to pay salaries and pensions to civil servants and to provide services to endowments and educational affairs and in general to play an active role in West Bank affairs.
In 1972, King Hussein conceived a plan to establish a united Arab federation which would include the West Bank and Jordan. This proposal never came to fruition.

In 1974, the Arab League decided to recognize the Palestine Liberation Organization (PLO) as the sole legitimate representative of the Palestinian people. The decision forced King Hussein to relinquish his claim to speak for the Palestinian people during peace negotiations and to recognize an independent Palestinian state that is independent of Jordan.

On 28 July 1988, King Hussein announced the cessation of a $1.3 billion development program for the West Bank explaining that the aim of this move is to allow the PLO to take more responsibility for these territories. Two days later the king dissolved Jordan's lower house of parliament, half of whose members represented constituencies in the Israeli-occupied West Bank.

On 31 July 1988, King Hussein announced the severance of all legal and administrative ties with the West Bank, except for the Jordanian sponsorship of the Muslim and Christian holy sites in Jerusalem, and recognised the PLO's claim to the State of Palestine. In his speech to the nation held on that day he announced his decision and explained that this decision was made with the aim of helping the Palestinian people establishing their own independent state.

The 1993 Oslo Accords between the PLO and Israel "opened the road for Jordan to proceed on its own negotiating track with Israel." The Washington Declaration was initialled one day after the Oslo Accords were signed. "On July 25, 1994, King Hussein met with Israeli Prime Minister Rabin in the Rose Garden of the White House, where they signed the Washington Declaration, formally ending the 46-year state of war between Jordan and Israel." Finally, on 26 October 1994, Jordan signed the Israel–Jordan peace treaty, which normalized relations between the two countries and resolved territorial disputes between them.

Gallery

See also
 List of East Jerusalem locations
 List of military occupations
 Military occupation
 Occupation of the Gaza Strip by Egypt
 Israeli occupation of the West Bank

Notes

Citations

Sources

Further reading
 
 
 
 
 
 Hussein Move May Snag Peace Initiative - published on Palm Beach Post on July 31, 1988
 Hussein Muddies Mideast Waters - published on Milwaukee Journal on August 1, 1988
 King Hussein's Bombshell - published on Pittsburgh Press on August 4, 1988

External links
 Disengagement from the West Bank

History of Palestine (region)
20th century in Jerusalem
Israel–Jordan relations
Military occupation
Annexation of the West Bank
Annexation of the West Bank
Annexation of the West Bank
States and territories established in 1948
States and territories disestablished in 1967
Annexation of the West Bank
Annexation of the West Bank
History of the West Bank
West Bank Governorate
1988 in Jordan
Palestine Liberation Organization
Israeli–Palestinian conflict
Arab–Israeli conflict
July 1988 events in Asia
1940s in the West Bank Governorate
1950s in the West Bank Governorate
1960s in the West Bank Governorate
1940s in Jerusalem
1950s in Jerusalem
1960s in Jerusalem
Annexation